Joo Ho-young (Korean: 주호영, born 8 January 1960) is a South Korean judge and politician who served as the interim Chairman of the conservative United Future Party (UFP)/People Power Party (PPP) in May 2020, and again from 8 to 30 April 2021. He has been the incumbent Member of the National Assembly for Suseong 1st constituency since 2020; before that, he represented for 2nd constituency from 2004 to 2020. He was the Minister for Special Affairs under the President Lee Myung-bak from 2009 to 2010.

Early life and education 
Born in Uljin, Joo attended to Neungin High School. He studied law in Yeungnam University.

Career 
After qualifying for the bar in 1982, Joo worked as a judge for 19 years.

He was firstly elected to the National Assembly in 2004 election. He served as the parliamentary leader of the Grand National Party (GNP) from 2006 to 2007. Following his re-election in 2008 election, he was appointed the Minister for Special Affairs.

On 18 July 2016, Joo announced he would run as the party chairperson for the upcoming leadership election. He lost to Lee Jung-hyun.

Following the political scandal, Joo left the Saenuri Party along with other dissidents. He was elected the parliamentary leader of the newly formed Bareun Party but in November 2017, he announced his departure in order to join the Liberty Korea Party (LKP) along with other 8 MPs. He, however, remained till his term as a parliamentary leader ended.

In 2020 election, Joo switched to Suseong 1st constituency, where the incumbent is Kim Boo-kyum (Democratic Party). He defeated the Democratic candidate and the former Minister of the Interior and Safety. He is now considered as a potential candidate for the President of the United Future Party (UFP), following the resignation of Hwang Kyo-ahn due to the election suffer.

On 4 May 2020, Joo launched his bid for the UFP's parliamentary leader. 4 days later, he was elected the parliamentary leader of the UFP, as well as the party's interim President where the position has been vacant since 15 April.

On 15 June, Joo announced his resignation as the UFP parliamentary leader following the Democratic Party's decision to take 6 parliamentary committees without dividing with opposition parties. He harshly criticised that the ruling Democratic Party is going to the one-party dictatorship. However, sources reported that almost all UFP MPs oppose his resignation.

Following the party's landslide victory in the 2021 by-elections, Joo returned as the party President. He has announced his intention to resign as the parliamentary leader on 16 April, adding that he would not serve until his term finishes on 29 May, but until the new person is elected.

On 10 May 2021, Joo announced his bid for the upcoming leadership election. He would lose the election to Lee Jun-seok.

Personal life 
He is married to Kim Sun-hui and has 2 sons. He is a Buddhist.

His father, Joo Koo-won, died on 9 May 2020, the day after his election as the UFP parliamentary leader.

On 13 March 1998, Joo suffered a skull fracture from a traffic collision. He barely survived following a 13-hour surgery.

Election results

General elections

References

External links 
 Official website
 Joo Ho-young on Facebook
 Joo Ho-young on YouTube
 Joo Ho-young on Twitter
 Joo Ho-young on Blog

1960 births
Living people
South Korean judges
South Korean Buddhists
Liberty Korea Party politicians
Bareun Party politicians
Yeungnam University alumni
People from North Gyeongsang Province
People Power Party (South Korea) politicians
Government ministers of South Korea
Members of the National Assembly (South Korea)
21st-century South Korean politicians